The 2012 season was Tromsø's 10th consecutive year in Tippeligaen, and their 26th season in the top flight of Norwegian football. It was Per Mathias Høgmo's third and final season as the club's manager. Tromsø participated in the Tippeligaen finishing 4th, the 2012 Norwegian Football Cup where they were beaten in the final by Hødd. They also tool part in the 2012–13 UEFA Europa League, entering at the Second qualifying round stage against Olimpija Ljubljana before being eliminated by Partizan on away goals at the Play Off stage.

Squad

Transfers

Winter

In:

Out:

Summer

In:

Out:

Competitions

Tippeligaen

Results summary

Results by round

Results

Table

Norwegian Cup

UEFA Europa League

Second qualifying round

Third qualifying round

Play off round

Squad statistics

Appearances and goals

|-
|colspan="14"|Players away from Tromsø on loan:

|-
|colspan="14"|Players who left Tromsø during the season:

|}

Goal scorers

Disciplinary record

References

Tromsø IL seasons
Tromso